The eastern box turtle (Terrapene carolina carolina) is a subspecies within a group of hinge-shelled turtles normally called box turtles. T. c. carolina is native to the eastern part of the United States.

The eastern box turtle is a subspecies of the common box turtle (Terrapene carolina). While in the pond turtle family, Emydidae, and not a tortoise, the box turtle is largely terrestrial. Box turtles are slow crawlers, extremely long-lived, and slow to mature and have relatively few offspring per year. These characteristics, along with a propensity to get hit by cars and agricultural machinery, make all box turtle species particularly susceptible to anthropogenic, or human-induced, mortality.

In 2011, citing "a widespread persistent and ongoing gradual decline of Terrapene carolina that probably exceeds 32% over three generations", the International Union for Conservation of Nature (IUCN) downgraded its conservation status from near threatened to vulnerable.

Description 
Eastern box turtles have a high, domelike carapace and a hinged plastron that allows total shell closure. Their shell has a middorsal keel that smooths out with age. The carapace can be of variable coloration but is normally brownish or black and accompanied by a yellowish or orangish radiating pattern of lines, spots, or blotches. Skin coloration, like that of the shell, is variable but is usually brown or black with some yellow, orange, red, or white spots or streaks. This coloration closely mimics that of the winter leaf of the tulip poplar. In some isolated populations, males may have blue patches on their cheeks, throat, and front legs. Furthermore, males normally possess red eyes (irises), whereas females usually have brown eyes. Eastern box turtles feature a sharp, horned beak and stout limbs, and their feet are webbed only at the base. Eastern box turtles have five toes on each front leg and normally four toes on each hind leg, although some individuals may possess three toes on each hind leg. Eastern box turtles range in size from 4.5 to 8 in (11 to 20 cm) long.

Eastern box turtles have many uniquely identifying characteristics as part of the box turtle group. While the female's plastron is flat, it is concave in males so the male may fit over the back end of the female's carapace during mating. The front and back of the plastron are connected by a flexible hinge. When in danger, the turtle is able to close the plastron by pulling the hinged sections closely against the carapace, effectively sealing the soft body in bone, hence forming a "box". The shell is made of bone covered by living vascularized tissue and covered with a layer of keratin. This shell is connected to the body through its fused rib cage which makes the shell permanently attached and not removable.

When injured or damaged, the shell has the capacity to regenerate and reform. Granular tissue slowly forms and keratin slowly grows underneath the damaged area to replace damaged and missing scutes. Over time, the damaged area falls off, revealing the new keratin formed beneath it. Unlike water turtles such as the native eastern painted turtle (Chrysemys picta), box turtle scutes continue to grow throughout the turtle's life and develop growth rings. Water turtles typically shed their scutes as they grow.

Distribution and habitat 
The eastern box turtle is found mainly in the eastern United States, as is implied by its name. They occur as far north as southern Maine and the southern and eastern portions of the Michigan Upper Peninsula, south to northern Florida and west to eastern Kansas, Oklahoma, and Texas. In the northern parts of their range, they are rarely found above 1,000 feet in elevation, while they may be found up to 6,000 feet in the southern parts of their range.  The eastern box turtle is considered uncommon to rare in the Great Lakes region; however, populations can be found in areas not bisected by heavily traveled roads. In the Midwest, they are a Species of Concern in Ohio, and of Special Concern in Michigan and Indiana. Eastern box turtles prefer deciduous or mixed forested regions, with a moderately moist forest floor that has good drainage. Bottomland forest is preferred over hillsides and ridges. They can also be found in open grasslands, pastures, or under fallen logs or in moist ground, usually moist leaves or wet dirt. They have also been known to take "baths" in shallow streams and ponds or puddles, and during hot periods may submerge in mud for days at a time. However, if placed in water that is too deep (completely submerged), they may drown. Many Eastern box turtles try to avoid stressful environmental conditions. When winter is in season, these turtles will burrow into the soil and stay dormant until the temperature rises. 

Eastern box turtles are known to have high site fidelity and remain in the same home range for a very long period. Some have been known to stay at the same site for upwards of 32 years, which is highly uncommon for reptiles. They have a very strong homing instinct and will rarely travel more than 1.5 miles (2.5 km) from their home territory. When they are relocated, they will still try to find their way back to their original home range.

Diet 
The eating habits of eastern box turtles vary greatly due to individual taste, temperature, lighting, and their surrounding environment.
Unlike warm-blooded animals, their metabolism does not drive their appetite; instead, they can just lessen their activity level, retreat into their shells, and halt their food intake until better conditions arise.

In the wild, eastern box turtles are opportunistic omnivores and will feed on a variety of animal and vegetable matter. There are a
variety of foods which are universally accepted by eastern box turtles, which include earthworms, snails, slugs, grubs, beetles, caterpillars, grasses, weeds, fallen fruit, berries, mushrooms, flowers, duck weed, and carrion. Studies at Jug Bay Wetlands Sanctuary in Maryland have also shown that eastern box turtles have fed on live birds that were trapped in netting. Many times, they will eat an item of food, especially in captivity, just because it looks and smells edible, such as hamburger or eggs, even though the food may be harmful or unhealthy.

Reproduction 

Reproduction for the eastern box turtle can occur at any point throughout the late spring, summer, and early fall months, but egg laying is most likely to occur in May and June, when rain is frequent. After finding a mate (there is no pair bonding, and mate-finding mechanisms are unclear), which can be a difficult task in areas where mates are sparse, the couple will embark on a three-phase courtship event. Following fertilization, the female finds an appropriate nesting site. Nest site selection is vital to egg development, as predation and temperature are primary concerns. Temperature affects the sex of offspring (Type I temperature-dependent sex determination), developmental rate, and possibly fitness. Females will use their hind feet to dig a shallow nest in loose soil; this process can take two to six hours. Eggs are generally deposited shortly after the digging phase, and each egg is deployed into a particular position. Eggs are oblong, 3 cm (1.5 in) long, creamy white, and leathery. Nests are then concealed with grass, leaves, or soil. A female can lay anywhere from 1 to 5 clutches of about 1 to 9 eggs in a single year, or even delay laying her clutch if resources are scarce. Females exhibit delayed fertility, wherein sperm can be stored in oviducts for several years until conditions are favorable for fertilization and laying. Incubation ranges widely depending on temperature, but averages 50 to 70 days.

Captivity 
Thousands of box turtles are collected from the wild every year for the domestic pet trade, although there are captive-bred individuals available. Buying a pet box turtle captive-bred rather than wild-caught helps discourage collection from the wild and helps preserve wild populations. The eastern box turtle is protected throughout most of its range, but many states allow the capture and possession of box turtles for personal use. Captive breeding is fairly commonplace, but not so much that it can supply the market demand.

Captive turtles may have a life span as short as three days if they are not fed, watered, and held in a proper container.  Although box turtles may make hardy captives if their needs are met, and are frequently kept as pets, they are not easy turtles to keep, owing to their many specific requirements. Eastern box turtles require high humidity, warm temperatures with vertical and horizontal thermal gradients, suitable substrate for burrowing, and a T5 HO fluorescent UVB lamp of appropriate strength. A basking area at one end of the enclosure is important to offer the turtle the ability to warm itself and is critical to sexually mature males and females for development of sperm and egg follicles, respectively.

Water should be fresh and clean and available at all times. A  large, easily accessible water dish for bathing and drinking is important to their health. 

Captive diets include various live invertebrates such as crickets, worms, earthworms, beetles and grubs (beetle larvae), cockroaches, small mice as well as wild strawberries, and fish (not goldfish). Mixed berries, fruit, romaine lettuce, collard greens, dandelion greens, chicory, mushrooms and clover are suitable for box turtles as well.  While some high quality moist dog foods may be occasionally offered, whole animals are preferable. Commercial diets such as Reptilinks, Mazuri Tortoise Diet, Repashy Veggie Burger, and Arcadia OmniGold can be used for variety and additional nutrition. Because box turtles seldom get the nutrients they need to foster shell growth and skeletal and skin development, they also require a multivitamin supplement and access to a cuttlebone for calcium.

The vivid shell color found in many eastern box turtles often fades when a turtle is brought into captivity. This has led to the mistaken belief that the color fades as the turtle ages. Insufficient access to full sunlight is likely to cause the color in the keratin layer to fade. In addition to providing UVB lighting, providing a varied diet complete with a carotenoid supplement can help sustain a pet's vibrant colors.

In captivity, box turtles are known to be capable of living over 100 years, but in the wild, often live much shorter lives due to disease and predation.

Conservation 
Eastern Box Turtles are listed as vulnerable on the IUCN Species Red List. They are currently fairly common, especially in the southern part of their range, but many populations are declining rapidly. Habitat loss, degradation, and fragmentation caused by urbanization or other human use is the main cause of this species vulnerability.

State reptiles

The eastern box turtle is the official state reptile of two U.S. states: North Carolina (which gives rise to the species and subspecies name carolina carolina) and Tennessee.  In Pennsylvania, the eastern box turtle made it through one house of the legislature, but failed to win final naming in 2009.  In Virginia, bills to honor the eastern box turtle failed in 1999 and then in 2009; a core reason is the creature's close links to North Carolina.

Gallery

References

External links 

Diet and Feeding Your Box Turtle
Center for Reptile and Amphibian Conservation and Management
Eastern Box Turtle Information

Terrapene
Turtles of North America
Reptiles of the United States
Fauna of the Eastern United States
Symbols of North Carolina
Taxa named by Carl Linnaeus

de:Carolina-Dosenschildkröte